Peggy Dickens (born 8 December 1975 in Schiltigheim) is a French slalom canoeist who competed from the early 1990s to the mid-2000s. She won a bronze medal in the K1 event at the 2005 ICF Canoe Slalom World Championships in Penrith.

Dickens also finished fourth in the K1 event at the 2004 Summer Olympics in Athens.

World Cup individual podiums

1 World Championship counting for World Cup points

References

Sports-reference.com profile
Yahoo! Athens 2004 Sports profile

1975 births
Canoeists at the 2004 Summer Olympics
French female canoeists
Living people
Olympic canoeists of France
Medalists at the ICF Canoe Slalom World Championships
People from Schiltigheim
Sportspeople from Bas-Rhin